Sukayk is a Syrian town located in the Al-Tamanaah Subdistrict in Maarrat al-Nu'man District. located near by Atshan. According to the Syria Central Bureau of Statistics (CBS), Sukayk had a population of 848 in the 2004 census.

References 

Populated places in Maarat al-Numan District